James Scott Holmes (August 2, 1882 in Lawrenceburg, Kentucky – March 10, 1960 in Jacksonville, Florida) was a pitcher in Major League Baseball. He pitched in 3 games for the Philadelphia Athletics during the 1906 season and in 13 games for the Brooklyn Superbas in 1908.

External links

1882 births
1960 deaths
Baseball players from Kentucky
Major League Baseball pitchers
Brooklyn Superbas players
Philadelphia Athletics players
Huntsville (minor league baseball) players
Augusta Tourists players
Rochester Bronchos players
Buffalo Bisons (minor league) players
Rochester Hustlers players
Newark Indians players
Nashville Vols players